Craig Viveiros is a British/Portuguese television and film director, whose notable credits include the BBC's 2015 adaptation of Agatha Christie's And Then There Were None, serial killer drama Rillington Place, and Mammoth Screen's adaptation of The War of the Worlds.

Initially a camera operator on several films, Craig has gone on to direct for the BBC, ITV, and Channel 4, as well as directing two feature films, The Liability and Ghosted.

In 2016, Craig was nominated for Best Director at the Royal Television Society (RTS) Craft and Design Awards for his work on And Then There Were None. His 2012 feature film, The Liability, was nominated for Best Feature Film at Torino Film Festival. His 2011 feature film, Ghosted, won Best Director at the New York International Independent Film and Video Festival, and the film was nominated for Best Feature Film at the Torino Film Festival, with lead actor, Martin Compston, winning Best Actor.

Selected filmography 
 Angela Black (2021)
 The Watch (2021)
 "A Near Vimes Experience"
 "Ook"
 The War of the Worlds (mini series) (2019)
 Tin Star
 "Fortunate Boy" (2017)
 Rillington Place (mini series) (2016)
 And Then There Were None (mini series) (2015)
 X Company
 "Quislings" (2015)
 "Into the Fire" (2015)
 Silent Witness
 "Falling Angels: Part 1" (2015)
 "Falling Angels: Part 2" (2015)
 "In a Lonely Place: Part 1" (2014)
 "In a Lonely Place: Part 2" (2014)
 Endeavour
 "Rocket" (2013)
 The Liability (2012)
 Ghosted (2011)

References 

Portuguese expatriates in the United Kingdom
Portuguese film directors
Portuguese television directors
British film directors
British television directors
Year of birth missing (living people)
Living people

English people of Portuguese descent